The Trilateral Commission is a nongovernmental international organization aimed at fostering closer cooperation between Japan, Western Europe and North America. It was founded in July 1973 principally by American banker and philanthropist David Rockefeller, an internationalist who sought to address the challenges posed by the growing economic and political interdependence between the U.S. and its allies in North America, Western Europe, and Japan.

The Trilateral Commission is headed by an executive committee and three regional chairs representing Europe, North America, and the Asia-Pacific region, with headquarters in Paris, Washington, D.C., and Tokyo, respectively. Meetings are held annually at locations that rotate among the three regions; regional and national meetings are held throughout the year. Most gatherings focus on discussing reports and debating strategy to meet the commission's aims.

Membership in the Trilateral Commission is highly selective and by invitation only; as of 2021, there were roughly 400 members, including leading figures in politics, business, media, and academia. Each country within the three regions is assigned a quota of members reflecting its relative political and economic strength. The organization represents influential commercial and political interests that share a commitment to private enterprise and trade, multilateralism, and global governance; this has subjected it to criticism for elitism.

History

Founding
The Trilateral Commission was formed in 1973 by private citizens of Japan, North American nations (the U.S. and Canada), and Western European nations to foster substantive political and economic dialogue across the world. The idea of the commission was developed in the early 1970s, a time of considerable discord among the United States and its allies in Western Europe, Japan, and Canada.
To quote its founding declaration:
 "Growing interdependence is a fact of life of the contemporary world. It transcends and influences national systems... While it is important to develop greater cooperation among all the countries of the world, Japan, Western Europe, and North America, in view of their great weight in the world economy and their massive relations with one another, bear a special responsibility for developing effective cooperation, both in their own interests and in those of the rest of the world."
 "To be effective in meeting common problems, Japan, Western Europe, and North America will have to consult and cooperate more closely, on the basis of equality, to develop and carry out coordinated policies on matters affecting their common interests... refrain from unilateral actions incompatible with their interdependence and from actions detrimental to other regions... [and] take advantage of existing international and regional organizations and further enhance their role."
 "The Commission hopes to play a creative role as a channel of free exchange of opinions with other countries and regions. Further progress of the developing countries and greater improvement of East-West relations will be a major concern."
Zbigniew Brzezinski, a Rockefeller advisor who was a specialist on international affairs (and later President Jimmy Carter's National Security Advisor from 1977 to 1981), left Columbia University to organize the group, along with:
 Edwin Reischauer, professor at Harvard University and United States Ambassador to Japan, 19611966
 George S. Franklin, executive director of the Council on Foreign Relations 1953–1971 
 Gerard C. Smith, SALT I negotiator and its first North American chairman
 Henry D. Owen, foreign policy studies director at the Brookings Institution
 Max Kohnstamm, European Policy Centre
 Robert R. Bowie, the Foreign Policy Association and director of the Harvard Center for International Affairs
 Marshall Hornblower, former partner at Wilmer, Cutler & Pickering
 Tadashi Yamamoto, Japan Center for International Exchange
 William Scranton, former governor of Pennsylvania. 
Other founding members included Alan Greenspan and Paul Volcker, both later heads of the Federal Reserve System. 

The organization's records are stored at the Rockefeller Archive Center in North Tarrytown, NY.

Meetings
The Trilateral Commission initiated its biannual meetings in October 1973 in Tokyo, Japan. In May 1976 the first plenary meeting of all of the commission's regional groups took place in Kyoto, Japan. Since the ninth meeting in 1978, plenary meetings have taken place annually. Besides annual plenary meetings, regional meetings have also taken place in each of the Asia Pacific Group, the European Group and the North American Group. Since its founding, the discussion group has produced an official journal, Trialogue.

Membership

Membership is divided into numbers proportionate to each of the think tank's three regional areas. North America is represented by 120 members: 20 Canadian, 13 Mexican and 87 American. The European group has reached its limit of 170 members from almost every country on the continent; the ceilings for individual countries are 20 for Germany, 18 for France, Italy and the United Kingdom, 12 for Spain and 1–6 for the rest. At first Asia and Oceania were represented only by Japan, but in 2000 the Japanese group of 85 members became the Pacific Asia group, comprising 117 members: 75 Japanese, 11 South Koreans, seven Australian and New Zealand citizens, and 15 members from the ASEAN nations (Indonesia, Malaysia, Philippines, Singapore and Thailand). The Pacific Asia group also included 9 members from China, Hong Kong and Taiwan. The commission now claims "more than 100" Pacific Asian members.

The Trilateral Commission's bylaws apparently deny membership to public officials. It draws its members from politics, business, and academia, and has three chairpersons, one from each region. The current chairs are former U.S. Assistant Secretary of Defense for International Security Affairs Joseph S. Nye, Jr., former head of the European Central Bank Jean-Claude Trichet, and Yasuchika Hasegawa, chair of Takeda Pharmaceutical Company.

Leadership
As of September 2021

Notable members
Antony Blinken, U.S. Secretary of State since 2021, son of Donald Mayer Blinken, stepson of Samuel Pisar 
Michael R. Bloomberg, founder/CEO of Bloomberg L.P., mayor of New York City 2002–2013, namesake of largest U.S. school of public health at Johns Hopkins
Robert R. Bowie, Director of Policy Planning 1953–1957, Foreign Policy Association, co-founder with Henry Kissinger of Harvard Center for International Affairs 1958, Counselor of the State Department 1966–1968, CFR, CIA Chief National Intelligence Officer 1977–1979
Lael Brainard, member of U.S. Federal Reserve's Board of Governors
Ian Bremmer, president of Eurasia Group and GZERO Media
Nicola Brewer, British diplomat
Esther Brimmer, executive director/CEO of NAFSA: Association of International Educators, Atlantic Council board
Mark Brzezinski, president and CEO of Brzezinski Strategies LLC, son of Zbigniew Brzezinski, and U.S. Ambassador to Sweden 2011–2015
Zbigniew Brzezinski, U.S. National Security Advisor in Carter administration
Steve Bunnell, partner in O’Melveny & Myers LLP, former General Counsel at DHS
R. Nicholas Burns, U.S. Ambassador to China since 2021, professor and board member of the Belfer Center for Science and International Affairs at Harvard Kennedy School, director of the Aspen Strategy Group, senior counselor at The Cohen Group, board member of Entegris Inc., CFR member, the Rockefeller Brothers Fund, Fulbright scholar at Queen Mary University of London 2020, vice chair of the American Ditchley Foundation, senior advisor at Chatham House, Under Secretary of State for Political Affairs 2005–2008, Atlantic Council board
Ash Carter, director of the Belfer Center for Science and International Affairs at Harvard Kennedy School, U.S. Secretary of Defense 2015–2017, CFR board, Aspen Strategy Group, Atlantic Council honorary director
Jimmy Carter, President of the United States 1977–1981
Jean Charest, partner in McCarthy Tétrault LLP, former Premier of Québec, member of the Queen's Privy Council for Canada
Michael Chertoff, chairman/co-founder of The Chertoff Group, Secretary of Homeland Security 2005–2009, judge on the U.S. Court of Appeals for the 3rd Circuit 2001–2003, Assistant Attorney General for the DoJ Criminal Division 2003–2005, Atlantic Council board
Raymond Chrétien, strategic adviser at Fasken, former chair of the Montréal Council on Foreign Relations, former Associate Under Secretary of State of External Affairs, former Canadian Ambassador to the Congo, Belgium, Mexico, the United States, and France, nephew of Jean Chrétien
Caroline Daniel, British journalist at the Financial Times
John M. Deutch, Director of CIA 1995–1996, Aspen Strategy Group)
Hedley Donovan, former editor-in-chief of Time
Jeffrey Epstein, former hedge fund manager convicted of sex trafficking in 2008, described as "an enthusiastic member of the Trilateral Commission" in 2002
Laurence "Larry" Fink, CFR board member, BlackRock CEO since 1988, WEF trustee
George S. Franklin, executive director of the Council on Foreign Relations 1953–1971
Richard Gardner, Columbia law professor, U.S. Ambassador to Spain 1993–1997, U.S. Ambassador to Italy 1977–1981
David Gergen, Harvard Kennedy School professor, adviser to Nixon, Ford, Reagan, Clinton, commentator for CNN
Jamie S. Gorelick, partner at WilmerHale, U.S. Deputy Attorney General 1994–1997, General Counsel of DoD 1993–1994, defended BP after 2010 oil spill, 9/11 Commission member, Amazon board member
Donald E. Graham, Graham Holdings chair since 2013, Washington Post publisher 1979–2000, Pulitzer Prize board 1999–2008, Facebook board 2009–2015, Bilderberg meeting attendee in 2009 and 2010
Fiona Hill, The Globalist writer, former Senior Director for Europe and Russia of the NSC

Carla Anderson Hills, CFR co-chair 2007–2017, U.S. HUD Secretary 1975–1977, U.S. Trade Representative 1989–1993
Christopher B. Howard, Robert Morris University president since 2016, CFR, Rhodes scholar, Harvard Board of Overseers, Aspen Strategy Group
Vivian Hunt, British businesswoman and partner at McKinsey
Samuel P. Huntington, former director of Harvard’s Center for International Affairs, former White House Coordinator of Security Planning for the U.S. National Security Council
David Ignatius, Washington Post journalist, Body of Lies author, Aspen Strategy Group
Ken Juster, U.S. Ambassador to India
John Kingman, British businessman and chairman at Legal & General
Henry Kissinger KCMG, National Security Adviser 1969–1975, U.S. Secretary of State 1973–1977, first chair of the 9/11 Commission Nov.–Dec. 2002, author of NSS Memo 200, Bilderberg attendee, subject of The Trials of Henry Kissinger, mentor of Klaus Schwab, Atlantic Council board
Max Kohnstamm, European Policy Centre
Jovan Kovacic, East West Bridge founder and president
Nicholas D. Kristof, New York Times columnist, Aspen Strategy Group member, Rhodes scholar
Tove Lifvendahl, political editor-in-chief of Svenska Dagbladet
Judith A. "Jami" Miscik, CFR vice chair, CIA Deputy Director for Intelligence 2002–2005, Global Head of Sovereign Risk at Lehman Brothers 2005–2008, PIAB chair 2014–2017, president/vice-chair of Kissinger Associates since 2009
Andrea Mitchell NBC News journalist, spouse of Alan Greenspan
Walter Mondale, VPOTUS 1977–1981, candidate in 1984 presidential election
Mario Monti, prime minister of Italy 2011–2013
John Negroponte, U.S. Deputy Secretary of State 2007–2009, UN Ambassador 2001–2004, first Director of National Intelligence 2005–2007, subject of The Ambassador, brother of MIT Media Lab founder Nicholas Negroponte
Joseph Nye, former U.S. Assistant Secretary of Defense for International Security Affairs, Atlantic Council board
Claudia Olsson, founder and chair, Stellar Capacity
Meghan O'Sullivan, Trilateral Commission North American chair, CFR board, Aspen Strategy Group
Henry D. Owen, foreign policy studies director at the Brookings Institution
Stephen Peel, British private equity investor
Martin J. Munsch III, U.S. United Nations Deputy Communications Pakistan Mission Relations 2003-2010 under Bush, Clinton 2003 - 2010
Edwin Reischauer, Harvard professor and U.S. Ambassador to Japan, 1961–1966
David Rubenstein, CFR chair, Carlyle Group founder, namesake of HKS building, WEF trustee, Aspen Strategy Group
David E. Sanger, New York Times White House correspondent, Aspen Strategy Group
Eric E. Schmidt, ex-CEO of Google, Bilderberg attendee
William Scranton, former governor of Pennsylvania
Gerard C. Smith, lead SALT 1 negotiator

Rajiv Shah, Rockefeller Foundation president, Atlantic Council board
Wendy Sherman, U.S. Deputy Secretary of State since 2021
Olympia Snowe, U.S. senator from Maine 1995–2013
Keir Starmer, leader of the UK Labour Party
James B. Steinberg, U.S. Deputy Secretary of State 2009–2011 under Obama, Deputy National Security Advisor 1997–2001 under Clinton, CFR member, Aspen Strategy Group, Bilderberg attendee
Jake Sullivan, U.S. National Security Advisor since 2021
Frances Townsend, Homeland Security Advisor 2004–2008, CFR board, Aspen Strategy Group, Atlantic Council board
Philip H. Trezise, Center for Law and Social Policy
Cyrus Vance Sr., U.S. Secretary of State 1977–1980
Jacob Wallenberg, Bilderberg attendee, "prince in Sweden's royal family of finance" 
Marcus "Husky" Wallenberg, Swedish banker formerly at Citibank, Deutsche Bank, S. G. Warburg & Co., Citicorp and the SEB Group
Paul C. Warnke, Center for Law and Social Policy, Clifford, Warnke, Glass, McIlwain & Finney
David Willetts, British Conservative Party peerage
Tadashi Yamamoto, Japan Center for International Exchange
Robert Zoellick, World Bank president 2007–2012, CFR member, Bilderberg attendee

Criticisms
Social critic and academic Noam Chomsky has criticized the commission as undemocratic, pointing to its publication The Crisis of Democracy, which describes the strong popular interest in politics during the 1970s as an "excess of democracy". He described it as one of the most interesting and insightful books showing the modern democratic system not to really be a democracy at all, but controlled by elites. Chomsky says that as it was an internal discussion, they "let their hair down" and talked about how the public needs to be reduced to its proper state of apathy and obedience.

Critics accuse the Commission of promoting a global consensus among the international ruling classes in order to manage international affairs in the interest of the financial and industrial elites under the Trilateral umbrella.

In his 1980 book With No Apologies, Republican Senator Barry Goldwater suggested that the discussion group was "a skillful, coordinated effort to seize control and consolidate the four centers of power: political, monetary, intellectual, and ecclesiastical... [in] the creation of a worldwide economic power superior to the political governments of the nation-states involved."

Conspiracy theories

Some conspiracy theorists believe the organization to be a central plotter of a world government or synarchy. As documented by journalist Jonathan Kay, Luke Rudkowski interrupted a lecture by former Trilateral Commission director Zbigniew Brzezinski in April 2007 and accused the organization and a few others of having orchestrated the 9/11 attacks to initiate a new world order.

Neo-conservative pundit Charles Krauthammer mockingly alluded to the conspiracy theories when he was asked in 2012 who makes up the "Republican establishment", saying, "Karl Rove is the president. We meet every month on the full moon... [at] the Masonic Temple. We have the ritual: Karl brings the incense, I bring the live lamb and the long knife, and we began... with a pledge of allegiance to the Trilateral Commission."

Publications
Books

See also 

 Bilderberg Group
 Chatham House (The Royal Institute of International Affairs)
 Council on Foreign Relations
 World Economic Forum
 U.S.-Japan Council
 Bohemian Grove
 Rockefeller family
 Samuel Huntington (author of The Crisis of Democracy)
 Shanghai Cooperation Organisation
 Valdai Discussion Club
 Internationalism

References

External links 

 The Crisis of Democracy (1975). A Report on the Governability of Democracies to the Trilateral Commission. New York University Press.

Further reading
Articles
Brzezinski, Zbigniew. “America and Europe”. Foreign Affairs, Vol. 49, No. 1, October 1970.  (pp. 11–30) Includes Brzezinski's proposal for the establishment of a body like the Trilateral Commission.

Books
 Brzezinski, Zbigniew. Between Two Ages: America's Role in the Technetronic Era. New York, NY: Viking Press, 1970. 
 Gill, Stephen. American Hegemony and the Trilateral Commission (Cambridge Studies in International Relations). Cambridge University Press, 1991.  
 Kay, Jonathan. Among the Truthers: A Journey Through America's Growing Conspiracist Underground. New York, NY: Harper, 17 May 2011. 
 Rockefeller, David. Memoirs. New York, NY: Random House, 2002. 
 Sklar, Holly. Trilateralism: The Trilateral Commission and Elite Planning for World Management. Boston, MA: South End Press, 1980. 
Sutton, Antony C. Trilaterals Over America. Boring, OR: CPA Book Publishers, 1995.  . 162 pages.
Wood, Patrick M. Technocracy Rising: The Trojan Horse Of Global Transformation. Coherent Publishing, 2014.

External links
 
    Membership as of August 2011]
    Membership as of April 2015
    Membership as of December 2016 
 Membership as of September 2021 
 Membership as of March 2022
 Is the Trilateral Commission the secret organization that runs the world? (Fact check against conspiracy theories from The Straight Dope, 1987)

1973 establishments in Washington, D.C.
Conspiracy theories
Foreign policy and strategy think tanks in the United States
Institutions founded by the Rockefeller family
Organizations established in 1973
Japan–United States relations